Condorchelys was a genus of stem turtle from Early Jurassic Cañadon Asfalto Formation of Argentina. Only one species is described, Condorchelys antiqua.

References

Bibliography 
 

Prehistoric turtle genera
Bajocian life
Aalenian life
Toarcian life
Early Jurassic reptiles of South America
Middle Jurassic reptiles of South America
Jurassic Argentina
Fossils of Argentina
Cañadón Asfalto Formation
Fossil taxa described in 2008